The volcano junco (Junco vulcani) is a New World sparrow endemic to the Talamancan montane forests of Costa Rica and western Panama.

This junco breeds above the timberline, typically at altitudes above 3,000 m, but there is an isolated population at 2,100 m on the Caribbean slope of Costa Rica and forest clearance on Cerro de la Muerte has allowed this species to descend to 2,600 m. The habitat is open grassy or brushy areas with some stunted scrubs. The nest is a neat, lined cup constructed on the ground under a log, bush or rock, or in a cavity on a vegetated bank. The female lays two brown-spotted pale blue eggs.

The volcano junco is on average 16 cm long and weighs 28 g. The adult has brown upperparts with dark streaking especially on the back. The wings and tail feathers are dark fringed. The underparts are grey. The sides of the head are grey with a black mask through the eye, a yellow iris, and a pink bill and legs. Young birds are brighter brown above with blacker streaking, and have buff-grey underparts.

Volcano junco calls include a thin tseee or a clearer wheew. The song is a mixture of squeaks and buzzes; k’chew chu k’wee chip chip chueee.

The volcano junco feeds on the ground on seeds, fallen berries, insects and spiders. It runs and hops, but flies only for short distances.

References

 Stiles and Skutch,  A Guide to the Birds of Costa Rica  

volcano junco
Birds of the Talamancan montane forests
volcano junco
volcano junco